The Liga Argentina de Football (LAF) was a dissident football association of Argentina that organised its own professional championships from 1931 to 1934. The Argentine Football Association (that had remained amateur) did not recognise those championships until both associations were merged in 1934. Currently all the championships organised by the LAF are considered officials by the AFA.

History 
At the beginning of the 1930s the Argentine footballers went on strike claiming for being free agents, due to a tacit agreement among the clubs establishing that none of them could hire a player without prior approval from the body. For that reason, clubs affiliated to Argentine Football Association met to discuss a proposal about creating a professional league.

The Racing Club representatives suggested to create a section with the most notable teams from Buenos Aires, Greater Buenos Aires and La Plata. That proposal was rejected by representatives from clubs outside Buenos Aires, who claimed for more federalisation. Finally, the parts could not reach an agreement, which resulted in a breakage into the Association. On May 19, 1931, "Liga Argentina de Football" was established, becoming the first professional football league ever in Argentina.

On the other hand, the official association (AFA) changed its name to "Asociación Argentina de Football (Amateurs y Profesionales)" and continued organising its own championships from 1931 to 1934, when both associations merged.

Founding members
The professional league was established by the following clubs:

 Argentinos Juniors
 Atlanta
 Boca Juniors
 Chacarita Juniors
 Estudiantes (LP)
 Ferro Carril Oeste
 Gimnasia y Esgrima (LP)
 Huracán
 Independiente
 Lanús
 Platense
 Quilmes
 Racing
 River Plate
 San Lorenzo
 Talleres (BA)
 Tigre 
 Vélez Sarsfield.

Competitions 
The LAF organised several competitions, as listed below:
 Primera División (1931–34)
 División Intermedia (1931–34)
 Segunda División (1931–34)
 Copa de Competencia (1932–33)
 Copa Beccar Varela (1932–33)

Champions

First Division

Second Division 
The LAF only organised one second division championship in 1934.

Copa Competencia

Copa Beccar Varela

See also 
 Federación Argentina de Football
 Asociación Amateurs de Football 
 Football in Argentina

Bibliography 
 38 Campeones del fútbol argentino 1891-2010 by Diego Estévez - Ediciones Continente (2010) -

References 

 Historia on AFA Web Site. https://www.afa.com.ar/es/pages/historia

Defunct football leagues in Argentina
Sports organizations established in 1931
Organizations disestablished in 1934
Football governing bodies in Argentina
1931 establishments in Argentina
Defunct sports governing bodies in Argentina
Argentina